Clément Harari (10 February 1919 – 16 February 2008) was an Egyptian-born French film and television actor.

Selected filmography

 It Happened in Paris (1952)
 Ça va barder (1955) - Sammy Kern
 Mon curé chez les pauvres (1956) - Marchot (uncredited)
 It Happened in Aden (1956) - Abdullah
 La Traversée de Paris (1956) - L'otage à lunettes (uncredited)
 Que les hommes sont bêtes (1957)
 Les Louves (1957) - Le préparateur en pharmacie
 Les Espions (1957) - Victor - le faux garçon de café
 Marchands de filles (1957) - L'ivrogne
 Échec au porteur (1958) - L'importateur Adrien Osmets
 Tamango (1958) - Cook
 Cargaison blanche (1958) - Un client
 Me and the Colonel (1958) - Man of the Gestapo
 In Case of Adversity (1958) - Un témoin au tribunal (uncredited)
 La Nuit des espions (1959) - Hans
 Arrêtez le massacre (1959) - The dentist
 Le Saint mène la danse (1960) - Archie
 The Long Absence (1961) - Man at Juke Box
 Fanny (1961) - (uncredited)
 La fête espagnole (1961) - Stern
 Cause toujours, mon lapin (1961)
 The Devil and the Ten Commandments (1962) - Un homme de main de Garigny (segment "Homicide point ne seras") (uncredited)
 Le scorpion (1962) - La Fouine
 The Longest Day (1962) - Bit Part (uncredited)
 Five Miles to Midnight (1962) - Mons. Schmidt
 Les Bricoleurs (1963) - Le professeur Hippolyte, l'assassin (uncredited)
 Jeff Gordon, Secret Agent (1963) -  Lorenz / Dr Gordon / Dr Mercier
 Charade (1963) - German Tourist (uncredited)
 Les Aventures de Salavin (1964)
 The Gorillas (1964) - Rha-Thé, l'indou magicien
 Sursis pour un espion (1965)
 Passeport diplomatique agent K 8 (1965)
 Secret Agent Fireball (1965) - Geoffrey Home
 The Sleeping Car Murders (1965) - Une 'femme' au bistrot (uncredited)
 Pleins feux sur Stanislas (1965) - L'espion soviétique
 Trap for the Assassin (1966) - Larouette
 Triple Cross (1966) - Losch 
 Monkeys, Go Home! (1967) - Emile Paraulis
 Faites donc plaisir aux amis (1969) - Le médecin
 Macédoine (1971) - Un client publicitaire
 Valparaiso, Valparaiso (1971) - Un très méchant
 Défense de savoir (1973)
 Lucky Pierre (1974) - Harry Welsinger
 Nuits Rouges (1974) - Le docteur Dutreuil
 Vous ne l'emporterez pas au paradis (1975) - Franz, le boss
 March or Die (1977) - Bernard (uncredited)
 Little Girl in Blue Velvet (1978) - Volberg
 Once in Paris... (1978) - Abe Wiley
 Les Égouts du paradis (1979) - L'Égyptien
 Ils sont grands, ces petits (1979) - Vladimir, le savant
 Gros-Câlin (1979) - Le professeur Tsourès
 The Fiendish Plot of Dr. Fu Manchu (1980) - Dr. Wretch
 Inspector Blunder (1980) - Dr. Haquenbusch
 Docteur Jekyll et les femmes (1981) - Reverend Guest
 Tais-toi quand tu parles (1981) - Le Professeur
 Flight of the Eagle (1982) - Lachambre
 Tout le monde peut se tromper (1983) - Léon Katz
 La Garce (1984) - Samuel Weber
 Saxo (1988) - Tonia
 Radio Corbeau (1989) - Maxime Katzman - un retraité de la marine marchande
 J'aurais jamais dû croiser son regard (1989) - Max
 Mano rubata (1989)
 Milena (1991)
 La note bleue (1991) - Demogorgon
 Les Clés du paradis (1991) - Le notaire
 Isabelle Eberhardt (1991) - Joue
 Witch Way Love (1997) - Grocer
 Train of Life (1998) - The Rabbi
 Le Grand Rôle (2004) - Le vieux sage 
 Dark Inclusion (2016) - Isaac Ulmann (photo)

References

Bibliography
André Bazin. Bazin on Global Cinema, 1948-1958. University of Texas Press, 2014.

External links

1919 births
2008 deaths
French male film actors
French male television actors
Male actors from Cairo